Cabrera de Almanza is a locality located in the municipality of Almanza, in León province, Castile and León, Spain. As of 2020, it has a population of 13.

Geography 
Cabrera de Almanza is located 67km east-northeast of León, Spain.

References

Populated places in the Province of León